Holidays in China may refer to:

Traditional Chinese holidays
Public holidays in China
Public holidays in Taiwan
Public holidays in Hong Kong
Public holidays in Macau

See also
 :Category:Public holidays in China